The 2017 Bill Beaumont County Championship Division 3 was the 13th version of the annual English rugby union County Championship, organised by the RFU for the tier 3 English counties.  This was the first season it would be officially known as Bill Beaumont Division 3, having previously been known as the County Championship Shield.  Each county drew its players from rugby union clubs from the fifth tier and below of the English rugby union league system.  Due to changes to the competition across the board, the Division 3 competition was reduced to eight teams (see the section below for more detail on this), divided into two pools (north and south) with the pool winners meeting in the final to be held at Twickenham Stadium.  New teams to the division include Middlesex, who returned to Division 3 after missing the previous year, and Sussex who last took part in 2013.  The reigning champions, Hampshire, were one of the promoted counties who were  playing in tier 2 in 2017.

At the end of the pool stage Oxfordshire and Sussex topped both of their groups to qualify for the final.  This was not without some controversy as Oxfordshire managed to make the final despite only playing 2 of their 3 group games.  With pool 1 on a knife edge going into the final game, Oxfordshire's opponents, Notts, Lincs & Derbyshire, were unable to field a front row and the game was awarded to Oxfordshire and 5 points.  By gaining the extra bonus point, Oxfordshire edged out group rivals, Buckinghamshire and Essex, who both had a superior for and against records.  Having said all this had Notts, Lincs & Derbyshire played it was probably likely that Oxfordshire would have won by a bonus point anyway.  At the Twickenham final an exciting game finished 29-29 after 80 minutes, with Oxfordshire crowned Division 3 champions for the first time in the county's history by virtue of scoring more tries (5) than Sussex (4).

Competition format

The Division 3 format was changed for the 2017 season. Where before there were ten teams playing in three pools, this was narrowed down to seven teams playing in two pools.  The first pool had four teams with two of the counties playing two home games and the others just one - the RFU plans to switch this around the following year so that teams that played one home game in 2017 will get two during the 2018 competition.  Pool 2 only had three teams due to the withdrawal of Middlesex who were supposed to take part, meaning that each team played one home game each.  The top side in each group went through to the final held at Twickenham Stadium.  

Due to changes to the County Championships implemented for this competition, promotion between tier 3 and tier 2 has been introduced.  This will be done over a two-year period, with points accumulated from the pool stages determining the promoted sides (one for each group), who will be turn replaced by the bottom two sides (one from each group) from tier 2.

Participating counties and ground locations

Group stage

Division 3 Pool 1

Round 1

Round 2

Round 3

Oxfordshire awarded 5 point win by default as Notts, Lincs & Derbyshire were unable to field a team due to a lack of front-row forwards.

Division 3 Pool 2

Round 1

Round 2

Round 3

Final

Oxfordshire champions by virtue of scoring more tries (5) than Sussex (4).

Individual statistics
 Note that points scorers includes tries as well as conversions, penalties and drop goals.  Appearance figures also include coming on as substitutes (unused substitutes not included).  Statistics will also include final.

Top points scorers

Top try scorers

Competition records

Team
Largest home win — 20 points 
30 - 10 Buckinghamshire at home to Notts, Lincs and Derbyshire on 13 May 2017
Largest away win — 29 points
37  - 8 Essex away to Notts, Lincs and Derbyshire on 6 May 2017
Most points scored — 37 points
37  - 8 Essex away to Notts, Lincs and Derbyshire on 6 May 2017
Most tries in a match — 5 (x2)
Essex away to Notts, Lincs and Derbyshire on 6 May 2017
Oxfordshire at Twickenham against Sussex on 28 May 2017
Most conversions in a match — 4
Sussex at home to Dorset & Wilts on 6 May 2017
Most penalties in a match — 3 (x2)
Sussex away to Berkshire on 13 May 2017
Berkshire away to Dorset & Wilts on 20 May 2017
Most drop goals in a match — 0

Most points in a match — 17
 Ed Phillips for Oxfordshire away to Buckinghamshire on 6 May 2017
Most tries in a match — 2 (x2)
 Pat Ockendon for Buckinghamshire at home to Notts, Lincs & Derbyshire on 13 May 2017
 Bradley Burr for Essex at home to Buckinghamshire on 20 May 2017
Most conversions in a match — 4
 Carlos Casanova for Sussex at home to Dorset & Wilts on 6 May 2017
Most penalties in a match — 3 (x2)
 Carlos Casanova for Sussex away to Berkshire on 13 May 2017
 Tom Finnie for Berkshire away to Dorset & Wilts on 20 May 2017

Notes

See also
 English rugby union system
 Rugby union in England

References

External links
 NCA Rugby

2017
2016–17 County Championship